In geometry, a generalized helicoid is a surface in Euclidean space generated by rotating and simultaneously displacing a curve, the profile curve, along a line, its axis. Any point of the given curve is the starting point of a circular helix. If the profile curve is contained in a plane through the axis, it is called the meridian of the generalized helicoid. Simple examples of generalized helicoids are the helicoids. The meridian of a helicoid is a line which intersects the axis orthogonally.

Essential types of generalized helicoids are
 ruled generalized helicoids. Their profile curves are lines and the surfaces are ruled surfaces.
circular generalized helicoids. Their profile curves are circles.

In mathematics helicoids play an essential role as minimal surfaces.
In the technical area generalized helicoids are used for staircases, slides, screws, and pipes.

Analytical representation

Screw motion of a point 
Moving a point on a screwtype curve means, the point is rotated and displaced along a line (axis) such that the displacement is proportional to the rotation-angle. The result is a circular helix.

If the axis is the z-axis, the motion of a point  can be described parametrically by

 is called slant, the angle , measured in radian, is called the screw angle  and  the pitch (green). The trace of the point is a circular helix (red). It is contained in the surface of a right circular cylinder. Its radius is the distance of point   to the z-axis. 

(In case of  the motion is a rotation around the z-axis.)

Screw motion of a curve 
The screw motion of curve
 
yields a generalized helicoid with the parametric representation 

The curves  are circular helices.
The curves  are copies of the given profile curve.

Example: For the first picture above, the meridian is a parabola.

Ruled generalized helicoids

Types 
If the profile curve is a line one gets a ruled generalized helicoid. There are four types:
(1) The line intersects the axis orthogonally. One gets a helicoid (closed right ruled generalized helicoid).
(2) The line intersects the axis, but not orthogonally. One gets an oblique closed type.
If the given line and the axis are skew lines one gets an open type and the axis is not part of the surface (s. picture).
(3) If the given line and the axis are skew lines and the line is contained in a plane orthogonally to the axis one gets a right open type or shortly open helicoid.
(4) If the line and the axis are skew and the line is not contained in ... (s. 3) one gets an oblique open type. 
Oblique types do intersect themselves (s. picture), right types (helicoids) do not.

One gets an interesting case, if the line is skew to the axis and the product of its distance  to the axis and its slope is exactly . In this case the surface is a tangent developable surface and is generated by the directrix
.

Remark: 
 The (open and closed) helicoids are Catalan surfaces. The closed type (common helicoid) is even a conoid
Ruled generalized helicoids are not algebraic surfaces.

On closed ruled generalized helicoids  

A closed ruled generalized helicoid has a profile line that intersects the axis. If the profile line is described by    one gets the following parametric representation 

 

If  (common helicoid) the surface does not intersect itself. 
If  (oblique type) the surface intersects itself and the curves (on the surface)

  with 

consist of double points. There exist infinite double curves. The smaller   the greater are the distances between the double curves.

On the tangent developable type 

For the directrix (a helix)
 
one gets the following parametric representation of the tangent developable surface:

The surface normal vector is

For  the normal vector is the null vector. Hence the directrix consists of singular points. The directrix separates two regular parts of the surface (s. picture).

Circular generalized helicoids 

There are 3 interesting types of circular generalized helicoids:

(1) If the circle is a meridian and does not intersect the axis (s. picture).
(2) The plane that contains the circle is orthogonal to the helix of the circle centers. One gets a pipe surface
(3) The circle's plane is orthogonal to the axis and comprises the axis point in it (s. picture). This type was used for baroque-columns.

See also 
 Helicoid
 Minimal surface
 Helix
 Ruled surface
 Catalan surface
 Conoid
 Surface of revolution

External links 
Gfrerrer: Kurven und Flächen, S. 47
mathcurve.com: circular generalized helicoid
mathcurve.com: developable generalized helicoid
mathcurve.com: ruled generalized helicoid
K3Dsurf: 3d surface generator

References 
Elsa Abbena, Simon Salamon, Alfred Gray: Modern Differential Geometry of Curves and Surfaces with Mathematica, 3. edition, Studies in Advanced Mathematics, Chapman & Hall, 2006, p. 470
E. Kreyszig: Differential Geometry. New York: Dover, p. 88, 1991. 
 U. Graf, M. Barner: Darstellende Geometrie. Quelle & Meyer, Heidelberg 1961, p.218
 K. Strubecker: Vorlesungen über Darstellende Geometrie, Vandenhoek & Ruprecht, Göttingen, 1967, p. 286

Surfaces